The 1998 Palmer Cup was held on 3–4 August 1998 on the Old Course and New Course at St Andrews, Scotland. The match was tied 12–12.

Format
On Monday, there were four matches of four-ball in the morning, followed by four foursomes matches in the afternoon. Eight singles matches were played on the Tuesday morning with a further eight more in the afternoon.. In all, 24 matches were played.

Each of the 24 matches was worth one point in the larger team competition. If a match was all square after the 18th hole, each side earned half a point toward their team total. The team that accumulated at least 12½ points won the competition.

Teams
Eight college golfers from the Great Britain and Ireland and the United States participated in the event.

Monday's matches

Morning four-ball

Afternoon foursomes

Tuesday's matches

Morning singles

Afternoon singles

References

External links
Palmer Cup official site

Arnold Palmer Cup
Golf tournaments in Scotland
Palmer Cup
Palmer Cup
Palmer Cup